Fermented tofu (also called fermented bean curd, white bean-curd cheese, tofu cheese, soy cheese or preserved tofu) is a Chinese  condiment consisting of a form of processed, preserved  tofu used in East Asian cuisine. The ingredients typically are soybeans, salt, rice wine and sesame oil or vinegar. In mainland China the product is often freshly distributed. In overseas Chinese communities living in Southeast Asia, commercially packaged versions are often sold in jars containing blocks 2- to 4-cm square by 1 to 2 cm thick soaked in brine with select flavorings.

History
According to the 1596 Compendium of Materia Medica written by the Chinese polymath Li Shizhen during the Ming dynasty, the creation of soybean curd is attributed to the Han dynasty Prince Liu An (179 – 122 BC), prince of Huainan. Manufacturing began during the Han dynasty in China after it was created.

Names
In Mandarin, the product is generally known as dòufǔrǔ, "dòurǔ" or fǔrǔ  though in southwest China it is often known as lǔfǔ. In English it is sometimes referred to as "soy cheese".

Nutrition

Nutritional value 
Fermented bean curd contains organic acids, alcohol, esters and other flavor primitives. It contains a large amount of hydrolyzed protein, free amino acids, fat, carbohydrates, thiamine, riboflavin, oxalic acid, calcium, phosphorus and other nutritional ingredients. It contains no cholesterol. The amount of protein in fermented tofu is about 12%-22%.

Ho et al. (1989) compared the volatile flavor compounds of red fermented bean curd and white fermented bean curd. Red fermented bean curd contains much larger amounts of alcohols, esters, and acids than the white variety. This may be due to the fermentation of red rice by Monascus spp. The differences in nutritional properties and fermentation between the two varieties are accompanied by differences in flavor and colour.

Health care function 
The Food Encyclopedia, written by Wang Su-Hsiung (1861) of the Qing dynasty, made reference to preserved bean curd as superior to difficult-to-digest, hardened tofu especially for the elderly, children, and ill persons. Fermented bean curd is reportedly easier to digest than unfermented bean curd, because it is made through the fermentation process of mold, making the protein more digestible, absorbable, and richer in vitamins. And the microorganisms decompose the phytic acid in the beans, making minerals such as iron and zinc, which are initially poorly absorbed in soybeans, more easily absorbed by the body. So it may be easier for patients, elderly, or children to eat and absorb the nutrients.

It has been suggested that fermented bean curd may have certain health benefits, although there is insufficient data to confirm these claims. One report claims that the fermentation process generates isoflavones, and that fermented bean curd could reduce the risk of coronary heart disease, lower blood pressure, and prevent osteoporosis.

Characteristics
Fermented bean curd has a special mouthfeel similar to certain dairy products due to the breakdown of its proteins which takes place during the air drying and fermentation. Lacking strong flavor prior to fermentation, fermented bean curd takes on the aroma and flavor of its marinade. The flavor is salty with mild sweetness. The texture and taste of fermented bean curd resembles a firm, smooth paste not unlike creamy blue cheese. (Indeed, this kind of tofu is sometimes called "Chinese cheese" in English.) Refrigerated, it can be kept for several years, during which time its flavor is believed to improve.

Culinary use

Fermented tofu is commonly used as a condiment, combined into sauces to accompany hot pot, or consumed at breakfast to flavor rice, porridge, gruel, congee, or erkuai. Usually either several bricks are placed in a small bowl covered in the flavored brine or one to one half bricks are placed into a bowl. Then, chunks are broken off the brick and consumed with a mouthful of porridge or gruel.  The brine may also be used for flavoring.
Fermented bean curd can also be added in small amounts, together with its brine, to flavor stir-fried or braised vegetable dishes (particularly leafy green vegetables such as water spinach). In the Chaoshan region of China, fermented tofu is the main ingredient used to make a stuffed biscuit known as furu bing.

Comparison with cheese
Both tofu and cheese are made from curds obtained from the coagulation of soy milk and dairy milk respectively. However, soybean curds are formed from the chemical destabilization of the micelles (using calcium sulfate, magnesium sulfate, etc.) allowing protein bonding while cheese curds are created from the enzymatic (rennet) hydrolysis of casein into para-casein.

Varieties

White preserved bean curd is the most common type and can be described without the white adjective. The flavor, color and aroma can be altered using various combinations of spices and seasoning in the brine with alterations in the commonly used combination of 10% rice wine and  12% salt. Those with no alcohol produces "small cheese cubes" (hih-fang) while those with double the alcohol content produces "drunken cheese" (tsui-fang). This variety is also available with chili and/or sesame oil. Seasonings can include anise, cinnamon, lemon juice, lemon zest, dried shrimp, and ham.  In addition, one can also obtain the curd dried, and without brine, which are then sold in paper cartons.

Red fermented bean curd (or ) incorporates red yeast rice (cultivated with Monascus purpureus) with the brining liquor for a deep-red color and distinctively thickened flavor and aroma. This variety may also contain chili. A popular derivative of this variety has an appearance of ketchup and is seasoned with rose wine, caramel and natural sugar.

Stinky fermented bean curd is fermented for over six months and is also popular due to its strong creamy flavor.  However, due to its strong acrid smell, this variety is an acquired taste. Note that stinky sufu differs from stinky tofu in appearance, consistency and salt content. Stinky sufu are made in the same cube-like shapes and has a similar smooth soft creamy texture as regular white sufu. In Taiwan, a green version is popular and made with sake lees, crushed leaves and a green mucor mold. It is then fermented for 12 hours and sold on the streets.

Chiang fermented bean curd (Chiang-doufu) is made with cubes of tofu soaked in either Chinese-style miso (Chiang) or soy sauce for several days. Usually reddish-brown in color and salty, it may be dried and fermented further and may also be mixed with sake lees. In Japan, miso is used.

Production

In order to produce fermented bean curd, cubes of dried tofu are allowed to fully air-dry under hay and slowly ferment from aerial bacteria and fungal spores. Commercially available fermented bean curd is made by using dry firm tofu that has been inoculated with the fungal spores of Actinomucor elegans, Mucor sufu, Mucor rouxanus, Mucor wutuongkiao, Mucor racemosus, or Rhizopus spp.. This freshly fermented tofu is known as 'mold tofu'.

The dry fermented tofu is then soaked in brine, typically enhanced with Chinese rice wine, vinegar, chili peppers or sesame oil, or a paste made of rice and soybeans.  In the case of red fermented bean curd, red yeast rice (cultivated with Monascus purpureus) is added for color. Fermented bean curd is generally sold in small glass jars.

See also

Notes

External links
Guide to making fermented bean curd (archived 16 December 2006) 
  The history of fermented bean curd is provided in this book as well as recipes for dishes that it can be used in. There is also a brief section on the production and how it is made.
  The consumption of fermented bean curd in China is examined in this article. It shows the ways that both the consumption and market has changed over time.

Cantonese cuisine
Chinese condiments
Chinese inventions
Fermented soy-based foods
Han dynasty
Tofu condiments